Edwin Maurice "Jim" Lookabaugh (June 16, 1902 – May 13, 1982) was an American football player and coach.  He served as the head football coach at Oklahoma Agricultural and Mechanical College—now known as Oklahoma State University–Stillwater—from 1939 to 1949, compiling a record of 58–41–6.  Lookabaugh's 1945 Oklahoma A&M team went a perfect 9–0, winning the first national championship for Oklahoma A&M.

Lookabaugh was alumnus of Oklahoma A&M, lettering in baseball, basketball, and football. He is one of three head football coaches at Oklahoma State to have played for Oklahoma State, along with Floyd Gass and current head coach Mike Gundy. From 1925 to 1929, he coached at Jet High School, and from 1930 to 1938, he coached at Capitol Hill High School. He is a member of the OSU Alumni Hall of Fame, the OSU Athletic Hall of Fame, and the National Football Hall of Fame.

After retiring from coach in 1950, Lookabaugh worked in real estate and investments.  He was the chairman of Oklahoma City's Urban Renewal Authority and served on other civic improvement committees for the city.  He died in Oklahoma City, on May 13, 1982.

Head coaching record

References

External links
 

1902 births
1982 deaths
American men's basketball players
Oklahoma State Cowboys baseball players
Oklahoma State Cowboys basketball players
Oklahoma State Cowboys football coaches
Oklahoma State Cowboys football players
High school football coaches in Oklahoma
People from Watonga, Oklahoma
Players of American football from Oklahoma